Wuthering Heights is a 1948 British TV adaptation of Emily Brontë's 1847 novel Wuthering Heights directed by an uncredited George More O'Ferrall.

Plot summary

Cast
 Kieron Moore as Heathcliff
 Katharine Blake as Catherine Earnshaw
 Christine Lindsay as Ellen Dean
 Patrick Macnee as Edgar Linton
 André Morell as Hindley Earnshaw
 Alfred Sangster as Joseph
 Annabel Maule as Isabella Linton
 Vivian Pickles as Catherine Linton
 Douglas Hurn as Hareton Earnshaw

References

External links
 

1948 in British television
1940s television plays
BBC television dramas
British television plays
Television shows based on British novels
English-language television shows
Films directed by George More O'Ferrall